George Fowell Plant Ltd, an established manufacturer of construction and industrial machinery in Wolverhampton, built a mid-engined sports car in 1962. The Gitane featured a rear-mounted 997c.c. Mini engine, Weber carburettor, multi-tubular frame, and disk brakes. Unfortunately, the Gitane was too highly-priced, and production ended after a few cars were built.

References

External links
Contemporary publicity photo

Sports cars
Defunct motor vehicle manufacturers of England
Cars introduced in 1962